is a dam in Hanamaki, Iwate Prefecture, Japan, completed in 1991.

References 

Dams in Iwate Prefecture
Dams completed in 1991
1991 establishments in Japan
Hanamaki, Iwate